OXO is an American manufacturer of kitchen utensils, office supplies, and housewares, founded in 1990 and based in New York City.

History 
OXO was founded by Sam Farber, an entrepreneur in the housewares industry, and his son, John Farber.  Sam Farber chose the name "OXO" as an ambigram that renders the three letters in "OXO" the same regardless of their orientation, either horizontal or vertically. Noticing that his wife, Betsy, who suffered from mild arthritis in her hands, was having difficulty gripping ordinary kitchen tools, he saw an opportunity to create more comfortable cooking tools that would benefit users. He worked with the design firm Smart Design to create the initial products in the line, including the Swivel Peeler, and Oxo continued to collaborate with Smart for many years. The first group of 15 OXO Good Grips kitchen tools were introduced to the U.S. market at the Gourmet Products Show in San Francisco, in 1990.

Sam Farber sold OXO to General Housewares Corporation in 1992. General Housewares Corporation was acquired by World Kitchen LLC. in 2000. In June 2004, Helen of Troy Limited bought OXO housewares for $273.2 million.

References

External links
 
 "A history of the OXO Good Grips peeler", Fast Company

Manufacturing companies established in 1990
Manufacturing companies based in New York City
Kitchenware brands
Food preparation utensils
Home appliance brands
1990 establishments in New York City
Helen of Troy Limited
2004 mergers and acquisitions